John Emrys Whittaker Jones (22 September 1915 – 10 July 1972) was an English actor of Welsh heritage.

After making his stage debut in Donald Wolfit's company in 1937, his film debut came in Powell and Pressburger's One of Our Aircraft Is Missing in 1942, and he began to develop a career in the British cinema of the 1940s. Due to his boyish looks he would often be cast as young innocents in films such as The Wicked Lady (1945), The Rake's Progress (1945), Nicholas Nickleby (1947), and Powell and Pressburger's The Small Back Room (1949).

When he was relegated to second features in the 1950s he concentrated on his stage career, maturing into an accomplished character actor in the process. The latter half of his career was mostly spent on television in such programmes as Softly, Softly, Out of the Unknown, Dixon of Dock Green, Doomwatch, Z-Cars, Special Branch, and as 'The Master of the Land of Fiction' in the Doctor Who serial The Mind Robber (1968).

He was married to actresses Pauline Bentley and Anne Ridler, and died of a heart attack in Johannesburg, South Africa in 1972, where he was in a stage production, playing Winston Churchill.

Film appearances

Selected theatre work
Macbeth (1942) directed by John Gielgud at the Piccadilly Theatre (as Malcolm)
Flare Path (1942) Original production at the Apollo Theatre, (as Flight Lieutenant Teddy Graham)
The Hasty Heart (1945) Original production at the Aldwych Theatre (as Lachlen)
Dial M for Murder (1952) Original West End production at the Westminster Theatre (as Tony Wendice)
Albertine by Moonlight (1956) at the Westminster Theatre (as Mac)

References

External links

1915 births
1972 deaths
Actors from Manchester
English male film actors
English male stage actors
English male television actors
20th-century English male actors